The Hollywood Wax Museum is a wax museum featuring replicas of celebrities located on Hollywood Boulevard in the tourist district in Hollywood, California, with other locations in Myrtle Beach, Branson, and Pigeon Forge. Among the wax replicas on display include those of A-List stars, classic entertainers, and legendary singers (such as Elvis Presley).

Overview
The museum, brainchild of entrepreneur Spoony Singh, opened on February 25, 1965, and claims in promotional literature to be the only wax museum dedicated solely to celebrities.
When Singh opened the Hollywood Wax Museum, the line to get in was 1/2 mile long. The former sawmill operator from Canada built the Museum's fame by befriending celebrities, gossip columnists, members of the foreign press association and fans.

After Singh's retirement, his sons and grandson have continued to own, operate and further the Hollywood Wax Museum's legacy. In June 2012, the family was recognized as Heroes of Hollywood by the Hollywood Chamber of Commerce Community Foundation for their staunch and generous support of the Hollywood community.

In popular culture
The Hollywood Wax Museum has appeared in the following movies and TV shows: The Mechanic (1972), Wes Craven's Cursed (2005), and America's Next Top Model (2007). The Hollywood Wax Museum is also featured on the video game, Midnight Club: Los Angeles.

Mr. Singh himself appeared on the popular quiz show What's My Line? on the night of November 7, 1965. This also marked the last show featuring long-time panelist Dorothy Kilgallen.

Location
The Hollywood Wax Museum building once housed the most exclusive hangout in Los Angeles: The Embassy Club. It is on Hollywood Blvd, near Highland Ave.

Sets and exhibitions
Wax figures and sets featuring replicas of celebrities continue to change regularly. There is also a Chamber of Horrors, featuring classic and current movie monsters.

Other locations in the US
The group opened Hollywood Wax Museum Branson in Branson, Missouri in 1996, which was completely renovated in 2009 and was recognized with the 2011 Branson Beautification Award for improving an important stretch of the Highway 76 strip. The next Hollywood Wax Museum was opened in Gatlinburg, Tennessee in 2007 and closed in 2010 to make way for the larger Hollywood Wax Museum Pigeon Forge attraction in Pigeon Forge, Tennessee that opened in May 2012.  The fourth location opened in Myrtle Beach, South Carolina in 2014 at Broadway at the Beach.  In 1979, Singh expanded his business operations after opening the Thousand Oaks Self Storage (now known as the Hollywood Storage Center).

References

External links 

 Hollywood Wax Museum - www.hollywoodwaxmuseum.com
Hollywood Wax Museum Entertainment Center - www.hollywoodwaxentertainment.com

History museums in Hollywood, Los Angeles
Museums established in 1965
Media museums in California
Wax museums in California
Hollywood Boulevard